"Happy" is a single by Christian singer Ayiesha Woods from her 2006 album Introducing Ayiesha Woods. It was released to Christian radio stations around early 2006. It lasted 20 weeks on the overall chart. The song is played in a F major key at 120 beats per minute. The song was used in an ad campaign for the DVD release of the 2006 film A Good Year. The song was also used in the 2009 movie "My Life in Ruins" starring Nia Vardalos (My Big Fat Greek Wedding).

Charts

Weekly charts

Year-end charts

References

2006 singles
Contemporary Christian songs
2006 songs
Gotee Records singles